Horton is a hamlet in Delaware County, New York, United States. It is located east-southeast of East Branch on the south shore of Beaver Kill.

References

Geography of Delaware County, New York
Hamlets in Delaware County, New York
Hamlets in New York (state)